The 1999 Tashkent Open was a women's tennis tournament played on hard courts at the Tashkent Tennis Center in Tashkent, Uzbekistan that was part of the Tier IV category of the 1999 WTA Tour. It was the inaugural edition of the tournament and was held from 7 June through 13 June 1999. First-seeded Anna Smashnova won the singles title and earned $16,000 first-prize money.

Entrants

Seeds

Other entrants
The following players received wildcards into the singles main draw:
  Lilia Biktyakova
  Iroda Tulyaganova

The following players received wildcards into the doubles main draw:
  Tatiana Perebiynis /  Iroda Tulyaganova

The following players received entry from the singles qualifying draw:

  Keiko Nagatomi
  Angelika Bachmann
  Anastasia Myskina
  Anna Zaporozhanova

The following players received entry from the doubles qualifying draw:

  Ekaterina Paniouchkina /  Anastasia Rodionova

Finals

Singles

 Anna Smashnova defeated  Laurence Courtois, 6–3, 6–3.
It was Smashnova's first career title.

Doubles

 Evgenia Kulikovskaya /  Patricia Wartusch defeated  Eva Bes /  Gisela Riera, 7–6(7–3), 6–0.

External links
 Official website
 ITF Tournament Profile
 Tournament draws

 
Tashkent Open
Tashkent Open
Tashkent Open
Tashkent Open